Hyblaea asava is a moth in the family Hyblaeidae described by Swinhoe in 1909.

References

Hyblaeidae